Røde Microphones (/ˈroʊd/; stylised RØDE) is an Australian audio technology company that designs and manufactures microphones and related accessories, audio interfaces and consoles, and audio software. It is recognised as a world-leader in several audio categories across consumer, prosumer and professional markets, specialising in products for music recording, location sound recording, broadcast and podcasting, filmmaking, and content creation.

RØDE is the flagship brand of the Freedman Group, which began operations in 1967 as Freedman Electronics and has since acquired several audio companies, including SoundField, APHEX and Event Electronics. It is headquartered in Sydney, Australia, with offices around the world including the USA and China, and exports its products to 118 countries globally.

History

Freedman Electronics
Freedman Electronics was established in 1967 by husband and wife Henry and Astrid Freedman. Originally from London, Henry Freedman relocated to Stockholm and started a family. Working as a chief engineer for a telecommunications company, Freedman would do after-hours servicing and modifications for a local agent of German pro-audio manufacturer Dynacord. In time, he was offered the Australian distribution rights to sell the brand, and as a result migrated there in 1966 with his family, including his son, Peter.

Setting up a shop in the suburb of Ashfield near Sydney, Freedman Electronics was one of the first companies in the city to design, manufacture, install and service audio products, including loudspeakers, amplifiers and microphones.

Henry died in 1987, and his son Peter took over the business. He invested heavily in growing Freedman Electronics' sound installation services, but his limited business experience combined with a difficult economy in the late 1980s almost bankrupted the company and left Peter in a considerable amount of financial debt.

Origins of RØDE
As Freedman Electronics entered the 1990s, Peter Freedman was seeking a solution to the company's financial situation. While pursuing other ventures, he recalled a large-diaphragm condenser microphone he had found 10 years previously at a trade show in China. After gauging local market interest, he imported 20 of them. 

The modified microphone was an immediate success, with sales likened to taking off like "a rat up a drainpipe". This comment led to the microphone being unofficially called the 'RODENT-1', which was later changed to the RØDE NT1, thus establishing the RØDE Microphones brand. The  'Ø' character was added in tribute to the Freedman family's Scandinavian heritage and to give the brand a European flavour.

Studio microphone range expansion 
Capitalising on the initial success of the NT1, RØDE introduced the NT2 large-diaphragm condenser microphone in 1992. The increase in demand for high-quality, affordable microphones for the growing home recording market garnered even more interest for the NT2. The company quickly expanded its global distribution network and began investing in developing its manufacturing capabilities in Australia, adopting a vertically integrated manufacturing model in order to bring production processes in-house.

In the late 1990s and early 2000s, RØDE expanded rapidly, introducing several studio condenser microphones to its range, including the Classic, NTV, NT3, NT4, NT5 and Broadcaster, as well a redesigned version of the NT1. The NT1 has since gone through several iterations and is now considered one of the most popular studio microphones on the market.

On-camera microphone success 
RØDE introduced the world's first compact on-camera microphone, the VideoMic, to its range in 2004. It found success amongst indie filmmakers and the growing vlogging and YouTube filmmaker markets. The company continued to expand its VideoMic range in the late-2000s and 2010s with the VideoMic Pro, VideoMicro and VideoMic NTG, as well as stereo models like the Stereo VideoMic Pro and Stereo VideoMic X, which received a Red Dot Design Award in 2014. RØDE is widely recognised as a leading manufacturer of on-camera microphones.

RØDE found further success in the on-camera microphone market with the release of the Wireless GO compact wireless microphone system in 2019. Building upon technology first introduced to the company’s product catalogue with the RØDELink range of wireless microphones in the mid-2000s, the Wireless GO was viewed by some as a "a game-changer in the [audio technology] industry" due to its compact size and a form-factor that featured a microphone built into the transmitter pack, allowing for completely wireless operation.

Podcasting innovation 
RØDE released its first dedicated podcasting product, the Podcaster—a dynamic USB microphone—in 2007 in response to the early boom of podcasting. Several RØDE products are commonly used for podcasting, including the NT-USB and Procaster microphones.

In 2018, RØDE released the RØDECaster Pro, an "integrated podcast production studio". It features several components typically found in professional broadcast studios, including a mixer with microphone inputs and headphone outputs, sound pads, and channels for integrating remote callers.

Acquisitions and partnerships

Event Electronics
In 2006, Freedman Electronics purchased loudspeaker manufacturer Event Electronics, a company that had been instrumental in establishing RØDE's US distribution channel in the early 1990s.

Aphex 
Aphex Systems was acquired by Freedman Electronics in 2015. The APHEX Aural Exciter and Big Bottom audio processers were later integrated into the RØDECaster Pro podcast production studio and RØDE Connect software.

Soundfield 
SoundField Limited was acquired by Freedman Electronics in 2016. SoundField was the first company to commercialise 360-degree surround sound (“ambisonic”) recording the late 1970s. The main applications for SoundField microphones is in 5.1 and 7.1 live sports broadcast, video game and film sound design, and virtual reality.

Organisation

Offices
RØDE is headquartered in Silverwater, Sydney in Australia, where its 110,000 square-foot manufacturing facility is located. It also operates a separate manufacturing and logistics facility in Pemulwuy, Sydney.  

The company established offices in the USA in 2001. Aside from Australia, the USA is the only country where it does not utilise a distributor. RØDE has seven offices in total, including the USA (Los Angeles and New York), the UK, Korea, China and Hong Kong.  The company currently employs over 500 staff worldwide.

Executive management 
RØDE was founded by Peter Freedman, who currently serves as Chairman of the Freedman Group.

Damien Wilson was appointed as Chief Executive Officer of the Freedman Group in December 2016. He joined RØDE in 2007 and served as Sales and Marketing Director for several years before becoming CEO.

In 2021, Australian politician and diplomat Joe Hockey became the first member appointed to the Freedman Group Board of Directors.

Manufacturing and research & development 
RØDE products are designed and manufactured in Australia. Since the early-1990s, the company has adopted a vertically integrated manufacturing model and has invested heavily in precision machinery, robotic automation and advanced manufacturing technology that has allowed much of its production to be brought in-house. This includes metal fabrication, capsule production, plastic injection moulding and circuit board printing using surface mount technology. The benefits of this model are two-fold, decreasing reliance on overseas suppliers for production while increasing research and development capabilities and speed-to-market.

RØDE’s primary manufacturing facility is located at the company’s headquarters in Silverwater, Sydney. It comprises three warehouses with a total footprint of over 110,000 square feet and houses over $100 million worth of machinery. Additional production and logistics operations are located in Pemulwuy, Sydney, and in the US, Europe and Asia.

The company has received numerous acknowledgements for manufacturing and innovation, including an Australian Export Award in 1999 and 2013. Then Australian National Trade and Investment Minister Andrew Robb was quoted saying “they [RØDE] represent the vanguard of Australia’s international businesses, and [these] awards recognise that".

Marketing 
RØDE is known for its innovative approach to marketing, utilising new media, creative competitions, interactive media, and influencer relations to promote its products.

In 2008, RØDE launched a series of educational videos on YouTube called 'RØDE University' that demonstrated how to achieve the best results using its microphones to record music performances. It was one of the earliest series of its kind from an audio technology brand. A second series was released in 2010, this time focusing on audio techniques and theory for broadcast, film and TV. It starred professional sound designer and author Ric Viers. These videos were also released on DVD.

In 2011, RØDE launched the ‘Interview with a Legend’ series, which featured filmed interviews with key figures in the audio industry, including Les Paul, Al Schmitt and Alan Parsons.

These videos were published on an online video portal called RØDE TV.

RØDE made headlines in August 2009 with its “$1 Mic” campaign, which offered customers the chance to buy a M1 microphone for AU$1 with the purchase of another microphone.

In 2014, RØDE launched the My RØDE Reel short film competition, which invites filmmakers to submit a film to win prizes, including audio equipment, funds, and scholarships. They have partnered with brands including Adobe, Panasonic, and Blackmagic Design. In 2020, the company made headlines when they awarded US$1 million to the winners of My RØDE Reel.

In 2019, RØDE launched the My RØDE Cast podcasting competition, modelled off My RØDE Reel.

RØDE has launched several interactive media campaigns, including the RØDE Soundbooth, an application that allows users to hear real-life recordings of the company's microphones in different recording scenarios, and the RØDE Ambisonic Library, a website of free ambisonic audio recordings that can be downloaded for use with the ‘Soundfield by RØDE’ software.

Customer service 
RØDE is well-known for its focus on customer service, offering free extended warranty on most of its products, some with a lifetime warranty, and worldwide technical support.

Products
RØDE manufactures products across several audio categories, including studio recording microphones, filmmaking microphones and podcasting equipment.

Studio condenser microphones 
RØDE first made an impact with its large-diaphragm studio condenser microphones in the 1990s. Developments in audio technology around this time, including the introduction of digital recording techniques, contributed to the growth of home recording practices. This created a sharp increase in demand for affordable studio condenser microphones. RØDE filled this gap in the market with the NT1 and NT2 microphones, which have since become some of the most popular microphones for studio recording.

Since then, RØDE has released several large-diaphragm condenser microphones including the Classic, Classic II, NTV, NTK and K2 valve microphones, the NT1-A and NT2-A, which are designed versions of the original models, and a redesigned version of the NT1. According to RØDE, the NT1-A is one of the world's quietest studio microphone with a published self-noise of 5dBA.

The company first introduced small-diaphragm condenser microphones into its product range in 2000 with the NT3. It was followed closely by the NT4 stereo microphone and the NT5 'pencil' condenser microphone. The company later added the NT55, NT6, M3, M5, and TF-5 – a collaboration with GRAMMY-award winning audio engineer Tony Faulkner – microphones to its range.

RØDE released its first ribbon microphone, the NTR, in 2015. It was awarded the Red Dot 'Best of the Best' Award for Product Design that year.

Dynamic and live performance microphones 
RØDE produces several dynamic microphones for studio, broadcast and live performance use. The company introduced its first dynamic microphone in 2007 with the Podcaster – a broadcast USB microphone. This was followed by an XLR variant named the Procaster and later the PodMic. RØDE's dynamic broadcast microphones have become widely used in podcasting, voice over and radio production.

The company released its first dynamic live performance microphone, the M1, in 2008—promoted through the '$1 Mic campaign and supported by a lifetime warranty. RØDE also released the MI-S, which features a locking switch.

USB microphones 
RØDE released its first USB microphone, the Podcaster, in 2007 to cater to the growing podcasting market. This was amongst the first products of its kind to utilise an in-built analog-to-digital converter and USB connection, allowing users to plug the microphone directly into a computer without the need for an external audio interface. The Podcaster was awarded an Australian International Design Award in 2007.

RØDE later added several USB microphones to its range, including the NT-USB and NT-USB Mini. RØDE has also integrated a secondary USB audio output into several of its products, including the VideoMic NTG and Wireless GO II.

Shotgun microphones
RØDE released its first shotgun microphones in 2005 with the NTG1 and NTG2. The range was later expanded with the NTG3, the NTG4 and NTG4+, NTG5 and NTG8.

RØDE shotgun microphones are known for their in-built batteries, digital switches, and RF-bias technology, which significantly improves resistance to moisture. The NTG5 was the first microphone on the market to utilise circular acoustic perforations on the microphone body in place of the linear slots typically found on shotgun microphones.

VideoMic range 
RØDE developed the first compact on-camera shotgun microphone, the VideoMic, in 2004. This was followed by the Stereo VideoMic in 2008 and VideoMic Pro in 2010. Originally intended for use with camcorders and other home movie devices, the VideoMic range became increasingly popular in the late-2000s with the introduction of consumer DSLR cameras that could record high-resolution video, such as the Canon 5D MkII, and the growing indie filmmaker and vlogging market.

The RØDE VideoMic range has since become recognised as the standard for on-camera microphones. The product line has expanded to include models for use with mobile devices (the VideoMic Me series), compact models (the VideoMicro and VideoMic GO), and stereo models including the Stereo VideoMic X, which won both an Australian Good Design Award and Red Dot Design Award in 2014. Several variations of the original VideoMic with updated designs and innovative features have been added to the range, including the VideoMic Pro+ and VideoMic NTG, which was voted ‘Best Microphone of 2020’ by VideoMaker.

Podcasting equipment
RØDE began producing podcasting products in the mid-2000s, shortly after the term was first coined by The Guardian columnist and BBC journalist Ben Hammersley. The company manufacturers a range of dedicated podcasting microphones, including the Podcaster, Procaster and PodMic. RØDE’s NT-USB, NT-USB Mini, NT1-A and Broadcaster microphones are also widely used for podcasting.

RØDE released the world's first dedicated podcast production console, the RØDECaster Pro, in 2018.

Mobile recording 
At the 2013 Consumer Electronics Show (CES), RØDE announced that it had commenced producing microphones for consumer smartphones, tablets and mobile devices. The first of these products was the iXY, a stereo microphone designed for Apple Inc.'s iPhone, iPad and iPod Touch devices. With the RØDE Rec app, the microphone is capable of recording at resolution of up to 24-bit/ 96 kHz, which at its launch was the only microphone for Apple Inc.'s portable devices capable of such a high sampling resolution. The iXY was recognised as a product of high-quality design in 2013 with a Red Dot award. A month after the release of the iXY, RØDE announced the smartLav lavalier microphone for Apple and Android smartphones and tablets.

Since then, RØDE has added several products for mobile devices to its range, including the iXLR interface for plugging professional microphones into iPhone and iPad, the VideoMic Me series of compact shotgun microphones for Apple and Android devices, and the SC6-L Mobile Interview Kit.

Ambisonic microphones 
Following the acquisition of SoundField in 2016, RØDE released its first ambisonic microphone in 2018, the 'SoundField by RØDE' NT-SF1. It was awarded 'Best Microphone of 2020' by Sound on Sound.

Custom microphones
In 2006, RØDE designed a microphone system for sound engineer Bruce Jackson that could be used as the primary podium microphone for the Asian Games that year in Doha. The microphone has since appeared at the 2010 Winter Olympics in Vancouver, 2010 Commonwealth Games in Delhi, 2010 Summer Youth Olympics in Singapore, 2011 Pan-Arab Games in Doha, 2011 Rugby World Cup in Auckland, 2011 Commonwealth Heads of Government Meeting (CHOGM), the 2012 Olympics and Paralympics in London, and at the 2016 Olympics and Paralympics in Rio.

Following the success of the Podium Mic project in 2006, Bruce Jackson again approached RØDE to create a custom microphone that would be used by singer Barbra Streisand on the European leg of her Streisand tour. Røde successfully modified its S1 microphone capsule to meet Jackson's needs for the tour.

RØDE has produced a very limited number of chrome plated M1 microphones, for use by RØDE endorsees. The microphones were originally created at the request of Pelle Almqvist of The Hives to match their on-stage attire.

See also

List of microphone manufacturers

References

External links

Company history
Sound on Sound article on Røde Microphones

Audio equipment manufacturers of Australia
Microphone manufacturers
Manufacturing companies based in Sydney
Electronics companies established in 1967
Australian companies established in 1967
Australian brands
Privately held companies of Australia